Genshi may refer to:

 Fujiwara no Genshi (1016–1039), Empress consort (chūgū) of Emperor Go-Suzaku of Japan
 Genshi (templating language), an XML templating language for Python
 jido-genshi, an experimental electronic music project